Pend Oreille County is a county located in the northeast corner of the U.S. state of Washington, along the Canada–US border. As of the 2020 census, the population was 13,401. The county seat and largest city is Newport. The county was created out of Stevens County on March 1, 1911. It is the most recently formed of the state's 39 counties. It is named after the Pend d'Oreilles tribe, who in turn were ostensibly named for large shell earrings that members wore. ("Pend d'oreille", while awkward in French, could be translated as "hangs from the ear".)

Geography

Highways
 U.S. Route 2
 State Route 20
 State Route 31
 State Route 41
 State Route 211
International Selkirk Loop

Adjacent counties
Boundary County, Idaho – east
Bonner County, Idaho – east
Spokane County – south
Stevens County – west
Central Kootenay Regional District, British Columbia – north

National protected areas
Colville National Forest (part)
Pacific Northwest National Scenic Trail (part)
Kaniksu National Forest (part)
Little Pend Oreille National Wildlife Refuge (part)

Demographics

2000 census
As of the 2000 census, there were 11,732 people, 4,639 households, and 3,261 families in the county. The population density was 8 people per square mile (3/km2). There were 6,608 housing units at an average density of 5 per square mile (2/km2). The racial makeup of the county was 93.53% White, 0.14% Black or African American, 2.88% Native American, 0.63% Asian, 0.20% Pacific Islander, 0.57% from other races, and 2.04% from two or more races. 2.05% of the population were Hispanic or Latino of any race. 21.1% were of German, 13.2% English, 10.2% United States or American, 9,2% Irish and 5.7% Norwegian ancestry.

There were 4,639 households, out of which 29.60% had children under the age of 18 living with them, 57.50% were married couples living together, 8.40% had a female householder with no husband present, and 29.70% were non-families. 25.00% of all households were made up of individuals, and 10.50% had someone living alone who was 65 years of age or older. The average household size was 2.51 and the average family size was 2.98.

The county population contained 26.30% under the age of 18, 5.50% from 18 to 24, 23.80% from 25 to 44, 29.50% from 45 to 64, and 14.90% who were 65 years of age or older. The median age was 42 years. For every 100 females there were 100.50 males. For every 100 females age 18 and over, there were 99.60 males.

The median income for a household in the county was $31,677, and the median income for a family was $36,977. Males had a median income of $36,951 versus $20,693 for females. The per capita income for the county was $15,731.  About 13.60% of families and 18.10% of the population were below the poverty line, including 27.60% of those under age 18 and 6.40% of those age 65 or over.

2010 census
As of the 2010 census, there were 13,001 people, 5,479 households, and 3,628 families residing in the county. The racial makeup of the county was 91.6% Caucasian, 3.8% American Indian, 0.6% Asian, 0.4% black or African American, 0.1% Pacific islander, 0.7% from other races, and 2.9% from two or more races. Those of Hispanic or Latino origin made up 3.0% of the population. In terms of ancestry,

Of the 5,479 households, 26.2% had children under the age of 18 living with them, 52.4% were married couples living together, 9.1% had a female householder with no husband present, 33.8% were non-families, and 28.2% of all households were made up of individuals. The average household size was 2.35 and the average family size was 2.84. The median age was 47.8 years.

The median income for a household in the county was $38,896 and the median income for a family was $46,971. Males had a median income of $45,728 versus $26,128 for females. The per capita income for the county was $22,546. About 13.6% of families and 18.3% of the population were below the poverty line, including 25.2% of those under age 18 and 13.3% of those age 65 or over.

Communities

Cities
Newport (county seat)

Towns

Cusick
Ione
Metaline
Metaline Falls

Unincorporated communities

Blueslide
Diamond Lake
Jared
Ruby
Sacheen Lake
 Scotia
Tiger
Usk

Politics

See also
National Register of Historic Places listings in Pend Oreille County, Washington

References

 
1911 establishments in Washington (state)
Populated places established in 1911
Eastern Washington